The Pipistrel Apis-Bee, also called the Apis/Bee, (Apis means bee in Latin) is a Slovenian mid-wing, single-seat glider and motor glider, that was designed and produced by Pipistrel.

By October 2018 it was listed as a "legacy" product and production had ended.

Design and development
The Apis-Bee is a second generation derivation of the original Pipistrel Apis design. The company explains the name of this version, "In some countries, the name 'Apis' is trademarked, so we are unable to use it. These countries are, as far as we know, the following: Germany, Austria, Switzerland and some Scandinavian countries. There, the aircraft is marketed as 'Bee'. We chose this because 'Apis' in Latin means a bee."

The aircraft is made from composites, predominately carbon fibre and fibreglass with some portions in sandwich configuration and some as shells. The tailplane is a T-tail configuration. The wing is the same as the wing used on the Pipistrel Sinus and Taurus. The powered version has a pylon-mounted, retractable Hirth F33 BS two-stroke single cylinder engine.

The Apis-Bee differs from the early Apis by the incorporation of 133 improvements, including: retractable landing gear, steerable tailwheel, ballistic parachute, enlarged  cockpit, new lighter Hirth F33BS engine that can be removed quickly and has faster engine extension and retraction, a redesigned propeller, lower vibration levels and better cooling, standard wing-mounted  fuel tank replacing the former  tank, new instrument panel, cockpit control ergonomics, the engine management system from the Taurus, re-balanced and lighter flight control feel, optional 5.00 × 5 main wheel, leather interior, solar panels to run the on-board electrical system, improved cockpit ventilation and canopy defog and a new firewall between the cockpit and the engine compartment.

Operational history
The Apis-Bee holds many Fédération Aéronautique Internationale world records in the under  class:

Free out and return distance: , Tanja Pristavec, DU feminine
Free distance using up to 3 turn points: , Tanja Pristavec, DU feminine
Free distance: , (Tanja Pristavec, DU feminine) 
Free distance using up to 3 turn points: , Boštjan Pristavec
Speed over a triangular course of : , Tanja Pristavec, DU feminine
Out-and-return distance: , Andrej Kolar, DU general
Speed over an out-and-return course of : , Andrej Kolar, DU general 
Free Three Turn Points Distance: , Andrej Kolar, DU general
Free out-and-return distance: , Andrej Kolar, DU general
Speed record over a triangular course: , Boštjan Pristavec

Specifications (Apis-Bee motorglider)

See also

References

External links
Official website archive on archive.org

2010s Slovenian sailplanes